The seventh and  final season of Teenage Mutant Ninja Turtles, titled Back to the Sewer or TMNT: Back to the Sewer, aired on Saturday mornings on the CW4Kids on CW Network in 2008–2010. With this season, the show moved from Fox's 4Kids TV lineup to the CW. The season began with the episode "Tempus Fugit"  which aired on September 13, 2008. It is followed by the TV movie Turtles Forever.

Story
Cody Jones is able to finally repair the Time Window, allowing the Turtles and Splinter to return to the 21st Century. However, Viral, who had survived her defeat in the previous season, hacks into the time window, taking control of it and sending the Turtles, Splinter, and Serling (who accidentally fell in) to various eras in an attempt to kill them. Just as the group is able to return home, Viral attacks Splinter, shattering him into countless bytes of data scattered across the Internet. Serling and the Turtles resolve to recover Splinter's bytes and return him to his whole self by digitizing themselves and entering cyberspace to find them.

Viral is forcibly assimilated into a digital copy of Ch'rell, who had done so prior to his attempted departure from Earth in the 3rd-season finale. This forms a new incarnation of the Shredder known as the "Cyber Shredder," who employs a new Foot Clan with Khan as his first lieutenant. Shredder makes several attempts to escape from cyberspace and enter the real world, often harassing the Turtles during their attempts to locate Splinter's data.

In the season's finale, Splinter is recompiled and returned to his adopted sons, who decide to celebrate April and Casey's wedding. Dozens of the Turtles' closest allies attend the ceremony- Angel, Usagi, Leatherhead, Karai, Dr. Chaplain- which is violently attacked by the Foot Clan, led by the Shredder, who has finally entered the physical world. In the midst of a massive battle between the Turtles' allies and the Foot, Donatello is able to destroy the Shredder. The wedding finally ends, in front of the Turtles, Splinter, and many other allies. Additionally, the Rat King and Renet watch from a distance, whereas the Daimyo, the Ultimate Ninja, Agent Bishop, and Cody observe the wedding through either technological or magical means.

Voice Cast 
 Michael Sinterniklaas as Leonardo: the leader of the Turtles who helped his brothers to find Splinter's data bits after Viral blasted him apart into Cyberspace. (12 episodes)
 Sam Riegel as Donatello: a genius engineer who blamed himself for Splinter's decompiling... up until "Hacking Stockman" and vowed to restore his bits from Cyberspace. (12 episodes)
 Frank Frankson as Raphael: the Turtles' hotheaded member and second in command who is stubborn but caring. (13 episodes)
 Wayne Grayson as Michelangelo: the Turtles' youngest member and a source of comic relief who is a member of the Justice Force as the "Turtle Titan". (13 episodes)

Supporting
 Veronica Taylor as April: the Turtles' ally who enters a relationship with Casey.
 Marc Thompson as
 Casey: the Ninja Turtles' ally who enters a relationship with April and ultimately marries her.
 Serling: Cody's robot servant who becomes constantly infuriated by the Ninja Turtles.

Villains
 Scottie Ray as Ch'rell / the Cyber Shredder: a new virtual incarnation of Ch'rell as a last resort.
 Sean Schemmel as Master Khan: a second in command of the Foot Clan who apparently comes from the ranks of the Foot Elite, the personal bodyguard of the Cyber Shredder who is based on the Utrom Shredder.
 Greg Carey as Hun: a hulking gangster and the leader of the Purple Dragons.

Recurring
 Darren Dunstan as Splinter: the Turtles' sensei and adopted father who deleted by Viral and sent across Cyberspace.
 Eva Kaminsky as Viral: a computerized system and a formal ally of the late Sh'Okonabo, who later fuses with Ch'rell's backup memory to become the Cyber Shredder.
 Christopher C. Adams as Cody: a descendant of April and Casey, who lives in 2105 and helps the turtles survive in the future.

Development
Following their intentions to return the characters to the present day and adapt a tone similar to the recent TMNT movie, 4Kids pitched a revamp of the series to Peter Laird codenamed "Superworld." The initial proposal was given the 'thumbs down' by Laird. Following this was a second proposal called TMNT Overload, which was approved by Mirage, but rejected by Playmates Toys, who then proposed their own idea, only to have that be rejected by 4Kids and Mirage.

On October 24, 2007, Steve Murphy confirmed on his blog that Playmates, Mirage, and 4Kids had firmly agreed on the new direction, which will take place in the continuity of the 2003 series and use the "more realistic aspects" of the aborted "Overload" pitch, with character designs similar to that of the 2007 TMNT movie.

Its description was as follows:

The Teenage Mutant Ninja Turtles are back in New York, ready to race across the rooftops and take on all challengers!

Not only are Casey and April back and ready to bust some bad guy butt, but a brand new, super advanced Turtle Lair is under construction (thanks to some hi-tech know-how Donatello garnered from the future), and of course there are all sorts of new heavy duty Turtle vehicles gearing up to roar down the streets of NYC and give the Foot a taste of some serious Turtle.

The stakes have never been higher, their enemies have never been stronger... and if the Turtles are going to be triumphant they’ll need to work together in ways they never have before.

Further info was revealed in December 2007:

When the Turtles return from the future to their present time, Viral interferes causing Master Splinter to get trapped in cyberspace, bits of his data code scattered all throughout the digital domain. The Turtles must find a way to access the virtual realm so they can gather Splinter’s code and save their beloved father before he is lost to them forever. And what good is a digital realm without a super bad guy! That's right; the Shredder is back in new form. In order to save their master, the Turtles must now face. The Cyber Shredder! Now the Turtles must fight on two fronts - cyberspace and the real world. And twice the locations, means twice the bad guys. That's right; the TMNT will be facing off against Hun, the Foot, Baxter Stockman, and some dangerous digital monsters! Get ready, because the Turtles are back from the future, back in action, and back to the sewers!

Three samples of a new opening theme song were announced by 4Kids to be under consideration on February 22, 2008, with the option for fans to vote on each of the samples and determine an official opening theme song. Six pitches for the theme song were released on February 29, 2008 most confirming that the Shredder will return in some form. Much of the theme lyrics identify him as "Cyber-Shredder." A trailer was released on August 8, 2008. On September 6, 2008, a sneak peek of the season's opening episode was featured on 4Kids official website.

Reception
The Back to the Sewer season was met with mainly negative reviews, with criticism of art style changes as well as the weak story arcs. It had the lowest number of views, 0.98 million views and a rank of 68% as of March 2009.

Episodes
<onlyinclude>{| class="wikitable plainrowheaders" style="width:100%"
|-
! style="background:#6c6;"|No. inseries
! style="background:#6c6;"|No. inseason
! style="background:#6c6;"|Title
! style="background:#6c6;"|Directed by
! style="background:#6c6;"|Written By
! style="background:#6c6;"|Original air date
! style="background:#6c6;"|Productioncode
|-

{{Episode list/sublist|Teenage Mutant Ninja Turtles (2003 TV series, season 7)
 |EpisodeNumber=154
 |EpisodeNumber2=12
 |Title=Super Power Struggle
 |DirectedBy=Roy Burdine
 |WrittenBy=Robert David
 |OriginalAirDate=
 |ProdCode=S07E12
 |ShortSummary=Mikey resumes his role as Turtle Titan, finding a green cape belonging to the Green Mantle after a battle. When he forces Raph to don it as a sidekick, Mikey is surprised that it grants him superpowers, impressing the Justice Force enough to invite Raph to join. Dr. Malignus tries to get the cape for his own villainous designs.

 Note:  This is the only episode where Leonardo does not appear. This is also the second episode where Donnie does not appear.
}}

|}</onlyinclude>

"Mayhem from Mutant Island" shorts
Starting on March 7, 2009, a series of 13 shorts, called "chapters", ranging from 90 seconds to two minutes in length, began airing on The CW4Kids during episodes of TMNT: Back to the Sewer and Chaotic: M'arrillian Invasion''. They were streamed on the 4Kids website a week in advance of airing them on television. The episodes comprise a single story called "Mayhem from Mutant Island." On March 27, 2010, the 13 shorts were re-aired and compiled as the single episode "Mayhem from Mutant Island".

References

External links

Season Seven Episode list with detailed synopses at the Official Ninja Turtles website

2008 American television seasons
2009 American television seasons
2010 American television seasons
Season 7
Usagi Yojimbo